Sultanah Fatimah Specialist Hospital (abbrev: HPSF) is a government-funded specialist hospital in Bandar Maharani, Muar, Johor, Malaysia. It is managed by the Ministry of Health of Malaysia.

Muar also known as the Royal Town of Bandar Maharani is located about 175 km from Johor Bahru, the state capital of Johor. It has an area of 2346.12 km2 and population of 437 164 people. HPSF is the third most important hospital in Johor after Sultanah Aminah Hospital dan Sultan Ismail Hospital, both in Johor Bahru. It is also a referral hospital for to neighbouring districts Batu Pahat, Segamat and Tangkak hospitals in the northern region of Johor state.

History

The hospital has its origins in a dispensary established in 1900 in a small building at Jalan Petri, Muar. It was known as the ‘Government Dispensary’ at that time and situated at the present HSBC Bank opposite the Muar Trade Centre building at the intersection with Jalan Othman, the street where the present Muar District Health Office is also located just a stone's throw away.

The whole health service was later shifted to the current location at Jalan Salleh in 1918, after a new building built at Muar River side when the town of Muar was being restructured.

Beginning in the 1920s, the hospital which was once known as the Muar District Hospital has gone through a variety of development until today. It went through tremendous transformation into a specialist hospital under the tenure of Chua Jui Meng as Minister of Health (1995 – 2004),  who was also a local-bred Member of Parliament (MP) for Bakri formerly. On 13 October 2003 the hospital status and name was converted from  'Hospital Muar'  to the present  'Hospital Pakar Sultanah Fatimah'  with the declaration was officially completed by the Sultanah of Johor then, Sultanah Zanariah.

Departments, units and services
Hospital Redevelopment Project Master Plan began since 1990 which the planned Ambulatory Care Centre Block would have equip the hospital with a variety of advanced medical equipments and facilities to cater for specialist services.  The Baby Friendly Program was established at the hospital officially by the Minister of Health then on 6 November 1997. Departments and units at HPSF included:
 	 
Clinical:
• Medical
• Ophthalmology
• Anaesthesiology
• Dermatology
• Otorhinolaryngology
• Psychiatrist
• Orthopedics
• Paediatrics
• SOPD
• Emergency & Trauma
• Obstetrics & Gynaecology

Clinical Support:
• Patology
• Imaging & Diagnostic
• Pharmacy
• Health Education
• Rehabilition &
• Medical Social Work
• Physiotherapist

Support:
• Dietetics & Food
• Supervision & Transportation
• CSSD
• Revenue
• Quality
• Medical Record
• Nursing
• Library
• ICT
• Public Health
• Management

Teaching hospital
In addition HPSF also plays the role as 'teaching hospital' being affiliated with medical schools i.e. Asia Metropolitan University and Manipal University College Malaysia (formerly Melaka Manipal Medical College) to provide medical education and training their medical students doing twinning programme between its campus here and its sister campus in Manipal, Karnataka, India.

Housemanship training
HPSF also provides Internship training for Medical Graduate Officer either from a Malaysian public or private university, or from an overseas-approved university or college under the medical service "secondary center" concept.

See also
 List of hospitals in Malaysia
 Healthcare in Malaysia

References

Notes

External links
 Official website
 Muar District Health Office
 Ministry of Health, Malaysia

Muar District
Hospitals in Johor
Teaching hospitals in Malaysia
Hospitals established in 1900
1900 establishments in British Malaya
Government buildings completed in 1918
Hospital buildings completed in 1918